Blastobasis chuka is a moth in the family Blastobasidae. It is found in Kenya, where it is known from the south-eastern coast and the central highlands.

The length of the forewings is 6.3–8.2 mm. The submedian fascia are faint. The basal one-third, from the base to the submedian fascia are pale brown intermixed with a few brown scales, the distal two-thirds from the submedian fascia to the margin are brown intermixed with a few pale brown scales. The hindwings are pale grey.

The larvae feed on the fruit of Allophylus abyssinicus, Chrysophyllum gorungosanum, Dictyophleba lucida, Diphasia species, Drypetes gerrardii, Flacourtia indica, Garcinia volkensii, Landolphia buchananii, Passiflora mollisima, Podocarpus milanjianus, Prunus africana, Rawsonia lucida and Vepris simplicifolia.

Etymology
The species epithet, chuka, refers to the Chuka Forest, the type locality.

References

Endemic moths of Kenya
Moths described in 2010
Blastobasis
Moths of Africa